James Blackmon may refer to:
James Blackmon Sr. (born 1964), American basketball coach and former player
James Blackmon Jr. (born 1995), American basketball player